The 2007–08 National Division Two was the eighth version (twenty first overall) of the third division of the English rugby union league system using the name National Division Two.  New teams to the division included Waterloo and Otley who were relegated from the 2006–07 National Division One while promoted teams included Blaydon coming up from the 2006–07 National Division Three North while Southend (champions) and Westcombe Park (playoffs) came up from the 2006–07 National Division Three South.

At the end of the season Otley made an instant return to their former division by beating runners up Manchester to the title by just one point, with Manchester also gaining promotion by virtue of their second-place finish - both teams would be promoted to the 2008–09 National Division One.  Relegated teams included Halifax, Henley Hawks and Nuneaton with Halifax picking up just two wins all season.  Halifax and Nuneaton would drop to the 2008–09 National Division Three North while Henley Hawks would go into the 2008–09 National Division Three South.

One of the more bizarre events to take place over the season was Redruth's game away at Cambridge.  Trailing 30 – 0 at half time the Reds returned to their dressing room to find that it had been raided by thieves while they had been playing.  Incensed at the missing valuables, including wedding rings, the Redruth team refused to come out for the second half.  This led to the game finishing 30 – 0 to Cambridge (who also got a bonus point for scoring four tries) and the RFU would dock Redruth 10 points for failing to complete the game.

Participating teams and locations

Final league table

Results

Round 1

Round 2 

Postponed.  Game rescheduled to 17 November 2007.

Postponed.  Game rescheduled to 17 November 2007.

Postponed.  Game rescheduled to 17 November 2007.

Round 3

Round 4 

Game abandoned after 40 minutes as Redruth players refused to play second half after thieves raided the players dressing room. Redruth deducted 10 points for failing to finish game.

Round 5

Round 6

Round 7

Round 8

Round 9

Round 10

Round 2 (rescheduled games) 

Game rescheduled from 15 September 2007.

Game rescheduled from 15 September 2007.

Game rescheduled from 15 September 2007.

Round 11

Round 12

Round 13 

Postponed.  Game rescheduled to 22 March 2008.

Round 14

Round 15

Round 16 

Postponed.  Game rescheduled to 8 March 2008.

Postponed.  Game rescheduled to 8 March 2008.

Postponed.  Game rescheduled to 2 February 2008.

Round 17

Round 16 (rescheduled game) 

Game rescheduled from 19 January 2008.

Round 18 

Postponed.  Game rescheduled to 22 March 2008.

Round 19

Round 20

Round 21

Round 16 (rescheduled games) 

Game rescheduled from 19 January 2008.

Game rescheduled from 19 January 2008.

Round 22

Rounds 13 & 18 (rescheduled games) 

Game rescheduled from 9 February 2008.

Game rescheduled from 15 December 2007.

Round 23

Round 24

Round 25

Round 26

Total season attendances

Individual statistics 

 Note if players are tied on tries or points the player with the lowest number of appearances will come first.  Also note that points scorers includes tries as well as conversions, penalties and drop goals.

Top points scorers

Top try scorers

Season records

Team
Largest home win — 65 pts
67 - 3 Manchester at home to Halifax on 22 March 2008
Largest away win — 31 pts
39 - 8 Westcombe Park away to Nuneaton on 16 February 2008
Most points scored — 67 pts (x2)
67 - 15 Westcombe Park at home to Nuneaton on 20 October 2007
67 - 3 Manchester at home to Halifax on 22 March 2008
Most tries in a match — 11
Westcombe Park at home to Nuneaton on 20 October 2007
Most conversions in a match — 7 (x4)
Westcombe Park at home to Halifax on 5 January 2008
Manchester at home to Blaydon on 8 March 2008
Southend at home to Henley Hawks on 15 March 2008
Manchester at home to Halifax on 22 March 2008
Most penalties in a match — 4
N/A - multiple teams
Most drop goals in a match — 2 (x3)
Nuneaton away to Blaydon on 13 October 2007
Nuneaton away to Halifax on 27 October 2007
Stourbridge at home to Otley on 15 March 2008

Player
Most points in a match — 27
 Robin Kitching for Otley at home to Blackheath on 19 April 2008
Most tries in a match — 4
 Adam Slade for Westcombe Park at home to Nuneaton on 20 October 2007
Most conversions in a match — 7 (x3)
 Paul Trendell for Westcombe Park at home to Halifax on 5 January 2008
 Gareth Wynne for Manchester at home to Blaydon on 8 March 2008
 Gareth Wynne for Manchester at home to Halifax on 22 March 2008
Most penalties in a match —  4
N/A - multiple players
Most drop goals in a match —  2 (x3)
 Howard Graham for Nuneaton away to Blaydon on 13 October 2007
 Rob Cook for Nuneaton away to Halifax on 27 October 2007
 Rod Petty for Stourbridge at home to Otley on 15 March 2008

Attendances
Highest — 1,453 
Blackheath at home to Westcombe Park on 24 November 2007
Lowest — 100 
Nuneaton at home to Manchester on 10 November 2007
Highest Average Attendance — 788
Redruth
Lowest Average Attendance — 207			
Nuneaton

See also
 English Rugby Union Leagues
 English rugby union system
 Rugby union in England

References

External links
 NCA Rugby

N2
National League 1 seasons